Charles Conn may refer to:

Charles G. Conn (1844–1931), U.S. Representative from Indiana and the namesake of the musical instrument company C.G. Conn Inc.
Charles Paul Conn (born 1945), president of Lee University
Charles R. Conn (born 1961), Warden of Rhodes House and CEO of the Rhodes Scholarships
Charles W. Conn (1920–2008), author and prominent religious figure in the Church of God
C.G. Conn, a United States manufacturer of musical instruments